Virgin and Child with Saint Anne is a subject in Christian art showing Saint Anne with the Virgin Mary and her son Jesus Christ.

Virgin and Child with Saint Anne may also refer to:
 Virgin and Child with Saint Anne (Dürer)
 The Virgin and Child with Saint Anne (Leonardo)
 Virgin and Child with Saint Anne (Masaccio)
 The Virgin and Child with St. Anne (van Steffeswert)
 Virgin and Child with St. Anne (Sangallo) by Francesco da Sangallo
 Madonna and Child with St. Anne (Dei Palafrenieri) by Caravaggio

See also
 Virgin and Child with Saint Anne and Four Saints by Jacopo Pontormo
 The Virgin and Child with Saint Anne and Saint John the Baptist by Leonardo da Vinci